XHFRC-FM is a noncommercial radio station on 98.7 FM in Monclova, Coahuila, Mexico. It is known as Espacio 98 and carries a cultural format.

History
XHFRC received its permit on July 9, 1999.

References

External links
Espacio 98 FM Facebook

Radio stations in Coahuila
Radio stations established in 1998
1998 establishments in Mexico